Urophora calcitrapae is a species of tephritid or fruit flies in the genus Urophora of the family Tephritidae.

Distribution
Turkey, Lebanon, Israel, Egypt.

References

Urophora
Insects described in 1989
Diptera of Asia
Diptera of Africa